José Ángel Blanco Hevia, simply known as José Ángel (born 26 January 1985), is a Spanish former professional footballer who played as a defender.

Football career
Born in Oviedo, Asturias, José Ángel finished his graduation in neighbouring Sporting de Gijón's youth setup, and made his senior debuts in the 2004–05 season with the reserves in Tercera División. On 29 April 2006 he made his professional debut, playing the last 13 minutes in a 3–1 away success over Real Valladolid.

After being released by Sporting in the 2006 summer, José Ángel resumed his career in Segunda División B but also in the fourth level, representing CD Puertollano, Amurrio Club, UB Conquense, Real Avilés and Marino de Luanco. With the latter he achieved promotion to the third level at the end of the 2010–11 season, appearing in 24 matches during the campaign. He remained with the team until released, and retiring, after the club was demoted at the end of the 2014–15 season.

References

External links
 
  

1985 births
Living people
Footballers from Oviedo
Spanish footballers
Association football defenders
Segunda División players
Segunda División B players
Tercera División players
Sporting de Gijón players
Marino de Luanco footballers
CD Puertollano footballers
UB Conquense footballers
Real Avilés CF footballers